Patrick E. Pettee   (January 10, 1863 – October 9, 1934) was a second baseman in Major League Baseball in the 19th century. He played for the Louisville Colonels of the American Association in 1891. He played in the minor leagues from 1885 to 1896.

Sources

1863 births
1934 deaths
People from Natick, Massachusetts
Baseball players from Massachusetts
Major League Baseball second basemen
Louisville Colonels players
19th-century baseball players
Lowell Chippies players
Milwaukee Brewers (minor league) players
Milwaukee Creams players
London Tecumsehs (baseball) players
Grand Rapids Shamrocks players
Buffalo Bisons (minor league) players
New Haven Nutmegs players
Troy Trojans (minor league) players
Sportspeople from Middlesex County, Massachusetts